The fastest times in the swimming events at the European Games are designated as the European Games records in swimming. The events are held in a long course (50 m) pool. The last Games were held in Baku, Azerbaijan in 2015.

All records were set in finals unless noted otherwise.

Long Course (50 m)

Men

Women

Mixed relay

References

European Games
Swimming at the European Games
Swimming